"Tell Me Why" is a song written and recorded by Karla Bonoff for her 1988 studio album New World. In 1993, the song was covered by American country music artist Wynonna and released in April 1993 as the first single and title track from her album Tell Me Why. The song reached number 3 on the Billboard Hot Country Singles & Tracks chart in May 1993 and number 1 on the RPM Country Tracks chart in Canada the following month.

Chart performance

Year-end charts

References

1988 songs
1993 singles
Karla Bonoff songs
Wynonna Judd songs
Songs written by Karla Bonoff
Song recordings produced by Tony Brown (record producer)
MCA Records singles
Curb Records singles